Autophagomyces is a genus of fungi in the family Laboulbeniaceae. The genus contain 24 species.

References

External links
Autophagomyces at Index Fungorum

Laboulbeniomycetes